The 1908–09 NYU Violets men's basketball team represented New York University during the 1908–09 college men's basketball season. The head coach was Benjamin Hermes, coaching his first season with the Violets. The team finished with an overall record of 12–0.

Schedule

|-

References

NYU Violets men's basketball seasons
NYU
NYU
NYU